Hippocampus nalu, the Sodwana pygmy seahorse, African pygmy seahorse or Honeypot seahorse, is a South African species of pygmy seahorse in the family Syngnathidae.

Discovery 
The discovery of the species, which inhabits the waters of Sodwana Bay in South Africa, was revealed by an international team of researchers in May 2020. This small pygmy seahorse is the first known pygmy seahorse that lives in the water around Africa. When a diver from the region gave a tip to the researchers, a team of the researchers later discovered this pygmy seahorse. The team that made this discovery arrived in South Africa to look for the pygmy pipehorse and unintentionally found this new species.

Description 
Hippocampus nalu is quite similar to H. pontohi and H. japapigu in appearance and colouration, with adults having a honey-brown colored skin with an overlay of white irregular reticulation and a reddish tail, and juveniles having a darker coloration. Like most syngnathids, their coloration helps them to camouflage with their surrounding habitat, as well as with algae. The Hippocampus nalu's highly different spine morphology along the superior trunk ridge also differentiates the species from its fellow pygmy seahorse. Being a pygmy seahorse, H. nalu is very small, with juveniles being ~10 mm long and adults growing up to a length of 2 centimetres.

Habitat 
This species is currently only known to occur in shallow coastal waters, at depths between 12 and 17 meters that contain flat sandstone-based coral reefs and short algal turfs.

References 

nalu
Marine fish of South Africa
Taxa named by Richard Smith
Fish described in 2020